The Division of South Australia was an Australian electoral division covering South Australia. The seven-member statewide seat existed from the inaugural 1901 election until the 1903 election. Each elector cast seven votes. Unlike most of the other states, South Australia had not been split into individual single-member electorates. The other exception was the five-member Division of Tasmania. The statewide seats were abolished at a redistribution conducted two months prior to the 1903 election and were subsequently replaced with single-member divisions, one per displaced member, with each elector now casting a single vote.

Members
Sorted in order of votes received

The Division was split into seven single-member seats at the 1903 election – Adelaide (Kingston, Protectionist), Angas (Glynn, Free Trade), Barker (Bonython, Protectionist), Boothby (Batchelor, Labour), Grey (Poynton, Labour), Hindmarsh (Hutchison, Labour) and Wakefield (Holder, Independent).

Election results
Elected members listed in bold. South Australia elected seven members, with each elector casting seven votes.

Notes

References

1901 establishments in Australia
1903 disestablishments in Australia
Constituencies disestablished in 1903
Constituencies established in 1901
Former electoral divisions of Australia